Total Eclipse of the Sun is a 1999 EP released by the German experimental/industrial band Einstürzende Neubauten. It was their first release recorded with their new line-up featuring Jochen Arbeit and Rudi Moser (formerly of Die Haut) and without FM Einheit (who had left during the sessions for their 1996 album Ende Neu); this has continued to be their line-up since.

Track listing

 "Total Eclipse of the Sun" - 3:52
 "Sonnenbarke" (single version) - 8:14
 "Helium" - 3:10
 "Total Eclipse of the Sun" (alternate vocal version) - 3:52

Notes
The first track, "Total Eclipse of the Sun", replaces "Anrufe in Abwesenheit" in International (Non-German) copies of their 2000 album Silence Is Sexy.

The third track, "Helium is gravity", later appeared in their Strategies Against Architecture III collection.

Written and composed by Jochen Arbeit; Blixa Bargeld; Alexander Hacke; Rudi Moser; N.U. Unruh
Recorded at Conny's Studio, Köln-Wolperath April 1998 and at Schwedenstrasse studio, Berlin in 1999 by Boris Wilsdorf
Mixed at Hansa studios, Berlin by Boris Wilsdorf in 1999

External links
Official site: "Total Eclipse of the Sun" on www.neubauten.org

Einstürzende Neubauten albums
1999 EPs
Mute Records EPs